Marie Millikan, née Víchová, (born October 9, 1948) is a former competitive figure skater who represented Czechoslovakia at the 1968 Winter Olympics.

Personal life 
Marie Víchová was born on October 9, 1948, in Prague, Czechoslovakia. She settled in the United States after her first marriage and married her second husband, Terry Millikan, in the first half of the 1970s. She has two daughters, Michelle and Melissa.

Career 
Competing in her first major events, Víchová placed 16th at the 1967 European Championships in Ljubljana, Yugoslavia, and 16th at the 1967 World Championships in Vienna, Austria.

The following season, Víchová placed 13th at the 1968 European Championships in Västerås, Sweden, before competing at the 1968 Winter Olympics in Grenoble, France. At the Olympics, she ranked 20th in compulsory figures, 16th in free skating, and 21st overall. Making her final amateur appearance, she finished 14th at the 1968 World Championships in Geneva, Switzerland.

After retiring from competition, Víchová skated professionally for Holiday on Ice, performing in Europe, South America, and East Asia. She began coaching in Indiana in the 1970s. In 2005, she became the skating director at Carmel Ice Skadium.

Millikan has also worked as a figure skating analyst for the Associated Press. She covered eight Winter Olympics for the agency.

Competitive highlights

References 

1948 births
American women non-fiction writers
American women sportswriters
Czechoslovak emigrants to the United States
Czech female single skaters
Czechoslovak female single skaters
Figure skaters at the 1968 Winter Olympics
Living people
Olympic figure skaters of Czechoslovakia
Figure skaters from Prague